The President of Ethiopia is the head of state of Ethiopia. The position is largely ceremonial with executive power vested in the Council of Ministers chaired by The Prime Minister. The current president is Sahle-Work Zewde, who took office on 25 October 2018. Presidents are elected by The Federal Parliamentary Assembly for six years, with a two term limit.

History 
The role of head of state of Ethiopia had evolved and changed through the political transformation of Ethiopia. The Emperor of Ethiopia was the head of state of Ethiopia prior the 1974 revolution. Following the 1974 military coup and abolishment of the Monarchies of Ethiopia the role of head of state was presided by the Chairman of the Provisional Military Government of Socialist Ethiopia as de facto President of Ethiopia.

Provisional Military Government of Socialist Ethiopia (PMGSE)- (1974-1987)
Chairman of the Provisional Military Government of Socialist Ethiopia was head of state and de facto President of Ethiopia. The first Chairman of Provisional Military Government was Lieutenant General Aman Andom who was also Chief of General Staff of the Ethiopian Armed forces.

People's Democratic Republic of Ethiopia (PDRE) - (1987-1991)
The Presidency was officially created by the 1987 Constitution, which established the People's Democratic Republic of Ethiopia. The president was elected to a five-year term by the National Shengo (legislature), with no term limits. The Presidency was Chief Executive of Ethiopia. The President was also Chairman of the Council of State, which presided as a legislator during the Shengo off session. The President had a Chief Executive power to rule by decree if necessary and also Commander-in-Chief of the Ethiopian Armed Forces. The only president under 1987 Constitution was Mengistu Haile-Mariam from 1987 to 1991. Following President Mengistu Haile-Mariam flee into exile Tesfaye Gebre Kidan served as Acting President of Ethiopia for only six days.

Transitional Government of Ethiopia (TGE) - (1991-1995)
The end of the Ethiopian Civil War in May 1991 results the end to the People's Democratic Republic of Ethiopia constitution. A new provisional constitution and Transitional Government of Ethiopia was formed. The Transitional Government of Ethiopia, was de facto Semi-presidential system with the President as head of state and Prime Minister as head of the government. During the Transitional Government of Ethiopia the Presidency had Chief Executive powers including appointing and dismissing the Prime Minister and the Commander-in-Chief of the Ethiopian Armed Forces. The only President who served during Transitional Government of Ethiopia was President Meles Zenawi.

Federal Democratic Republic of Ethiopia (FDRE) - (1995 - Present)
A draft of a new constitution was declared in 1995 as the Constitution of The Federal Democratic Republic of Ethiopia. The 1995 Constitution of Ethiopia transform Ethiopia to a Parliamentary Republic which effectively made the presidency a ceremonial and apolitical head of state.

The Constitution of The Federal Democratic Republic of Ethiopia explicitly vests executive power in the Council of Ministers and names the Prime Minister as Chief Executive and the de jure Commander-in-Chief of the Ethiopian Armed Forces. However, The President preside as a ceremonial Commander-in-Chief of the Ethiopian Armed Forces.

The first President of FDRE was President Negasso Gidada who served from 1995 to 2001. The current President is Sahle-Work Zewde ,who is also the first female President of Ethiopia, serving since 2018.

Nominations and Appointment of the President

The Federal Parliamentary Assembly nominate the candidate for President. Presidential tenure is not keyed to that of the Federal Parliamentary Assembly  in order to assure continuity in government and the nonpartisan character of the office.

The nominee for President is elected during the session of the Federal Parliamentary Assembly and approves the candidacy by a two-third majority vote. The nominee shall vacate the seat after being elected President if in case the nominee is member of the Federal Parliamentary Assembly.

The term of office of the President is  six years. No person can be elected President for more than two terms. Upon election in accordance with the constitution The President, before commencing a responsibility as president, shall present before the Federal Parliamentary Assembly and make a declaration of loyalty to the Constitution and the People of Ethiopia in the following words:

"I......., when on this date commence my responsibility as President of the Federal Democratic Republic, of Ethiopia, pledge to carry out faithfully the high responsibility entrusted to me."

Powers and Duties
The 1995 Ethiopian Constitution lays out the duties and powers of the President of the Republic, to include the following:

1. The President open the joint session of the Federal Parliamentary Assembly at the commencement of their annual sessions.

2. The President proclaim in the Negarit Gazeta laws and international agreements approved by the House of Peoples' Representatives in accordance with the Constitution.

3. The President appoint The Prime Minister with the consent of House of Peoples' Representatives.

4. The President upon recommendation by The Prime Minister, appoint ambassadors and other envoys to represent the country abroad.

5. The President receive the credentials of foreign ambassadors and special envoys.

6. The President  award medals, prizes and gifts in accordance with conditions and procedures established by law.

7. The President , as a ceremonial Commander-in-Chief of the Ethiopian Armed Forces, upon recommendation by The Prime Minister (de jure Commander-in-Chief) grant high military titles and awards.

8. The President , in accordance with conditions and procedures established by law, grant pardon.

The President's powers and duties must not be countersigned by The Prime Minister to be valid. All the listed roles have been recognized as an autonomous powers of The President. The President represents the country in various delegations, meetings, and international platforms that require the attendance of the head of state.

Succession
When the President is unable to preside and exercise his/her duties due to illness, death, resignation, conviction or impeachment the two chambers of the Federal Parliamentary Assembly shall immediately designate an Acting President. With no longer than a week time the Federal Parliamentary Assembly shall convene by an extraordinary session to elect the successor and declare the new President.

Security
The President of Ethiopia is protected by The Republican Guard which is a special armed unit of the Ethiopian National Defense Force. The Republican Guard's Counter Military Unit is responsible for protecting the presidential palace commonly known as Jubilee Palace. The Counter Military Unit carries heavy assault rifles such as Israel-made Tavor-21 and American M-4's and long rang snipers that can penetrate bullet proof glass. The Republican Guard also uses helicopters as well as armored vehicles.

List of President of Ethiopia
In the list, the Chairman of Provisional Military Government of Socialist Ethiopia is considered to be de facto President of Ethiopia during the Provisional Military Government from 1974 to 1987. The numbering starts and followed based on the different system of government put in effect by subsequent Ethiopian administrations.

Latest election

See also
Emperor of Ethiopia
List of emperors of Ethiopia
List of presidents of Ethiopia
List of heads of government of Ethiopia
Rulers of Ethiopia
Vice President of Ethiopia

Notes

References

Government of Ethiopia
1987 establishments in Ethiopia

et:Etioopia riigipeade loend